Miss World Spain 2013 was the very 1st edition of the Miss World Spain pageant, held on June 23, 2013. The winner was Elena Ibarbia Jiménez of Basque and she represented Spain in Miss World 2013.

Final results

Special Awards

Official Delegates

Notes

Withdrawals
 Almería
 Araba
 Asturias
 Ávila
 Badajoz
 Barcelona
 Burgos
 Cáceres
 Cádiz
 Cantabria
 Castile and León
 Ciudad Real
 Cuenca
 Ceuta
 Gerona
 Guadalajara
 Guipúzcoa
 Huesca
 Jaén
 La Coruña
 La Rioja
 León
 Lérida
 Lugo
 Navarre
 Orense
 Pontevedra
 Salamanca
 Soria
 Tarragona
 Teruel
 Toledo
 Valladolid
 Vizcaya
 Zamora
 Zaragoza

References

External links

Miss Spain
2013 in Spain
2013 beauty pageants